Mia madre is a 2015 internationally co-produced drama film directed by Nanni Moretti. It was selected to compete for the Palme d'Or at the 2015 Cannes Film Festival. It was screened in the Special Presentations section of the 2015 Toronto International Film Festival.

Plot
Margherita (Margherita Buy) is a director working on a social-realist film about a factory strike called Noi siamo qui (We Are Here), starring American actor Barry Huggins (John Turturro) as the factory owner. Huggins consistently fails to deliver his lines properly and the fraught nature of the shoot is exacerbated by unhelpful advice from Margherita to her actors. She breaks up with her boyfriend, an actor in the film, and is divorced from the father of her daughter, Livia (Beatrice Mancini). Her brother Giovanni (Nanni Moretti) has taken time off work to help care for their ailing mother, Ada (Giulia Lazzarini), a retired classics teacher who has been hospitalised. Margherita comes to feel guilty for not taking on more responsibility for her mother and reflects on her often cold relations with her family, friends and colleagues.

Cast

 Margherita Buy as Margherita
 John Turturro as Barry Huggins
 Giulia Lazzarini as Ada
 Nanni Moretti as Giovanni
 Beatrice Mancini as Livia
 Stefano Abbati as Federico
 Enrico Ianniello as Vittorio
 Anna Bellato as Actor
 Toni Laudadio as Producer

Reception
Mia Madre has an 84% approval rating on Rotten Tomatoes and a 70/100 on review aggregator Metacritic. Les Cahiers du cinéma placed the film 1st in their 2015 Top Ten chart and featured Nanni Moretti on their November's cover. High on Films Website wrote "Life, death, film-making, solitude, relationships & existential crisis form the crux of Nanni Moretti's Mia Madre".

Awards and nominations

References

External links
 
 
 

2015 drama films
2015 films
Films directed by Nanni Moretti
Films shot in Rome
French drama films
Italian drama films
2010s Italian-language films
Films set in Rome
Films about film directors and producers
2010s English-language films
2010s French films
English-language French films
English-language Italian films
Italian-language French films
2015 multilingual films
French multilingual films
Italian multilingual films